Changan Mazda (officially Changan Mazda Automobile Co., Ltd.) is an automotive manufacturing company headquartered in Nanjing, China and a 50:50 joint venture between Changan Automobile and Mazda. The company's principal activity is the manufacture of Mazda brand passenger cars for the Chinese market. The company was formed in December 2012 after the decision to restructure Changan Ford Mazda, whereby Ford and Mazda agreed to work with Changan as separate joint ventures.

Products 
Mazda3 Axela
Mazda CX-5
Mazda CX-8
Mazda CX-30
Mazda CX-50

Gallery

References

External links

Mazda
Mazda
Car manufacturers of China